The Russian People is a 1942 play by Clifford Odets adapted from a Russian original by Konstantin Simonov.

External links 
 

Plays by Clifford Odets
1942 plays